

Yarkovsky District  is one of the 22 administrative divisions of Tyumen Oblast, Russia. As a municipal division, it is incorporated as Yarkovsky Municipal District. It is located in the western central part of the oblast.

Its administrative center is the rural locality of Yarkovo. Population: 23,184 (2010 Census);  The population of Yarkovo accounts for 30.3% of the district's total population.

See also 
 Dubrovinskoye rural settlement

References

Notes

Sources 
 
 

Districts of Tyumen Oblast